Adam Zajíček (born 25 February 1993) is a Czech volleyball player for VK Kladno and the Czech national team.

He participated at the 2017 Men's European Volleyball Championship.

Sporting achievements

Clubs 
Czech Cup:
  2014, 2016
Czech Championship:
  2015, 2016
  2014, 2018
  2017

National Team 
European League:
  2018
  2013

References

External links
Toukan player profile
WorldLeague profile
Volleyball-Movies profile
CEV profile

1993 births
Living people
Sportspeople from Prague
Czech men's volleyball players